Raymond Kessler is a Haitian retired professional wrestler, who has dwarfism, and wrestled under the name Haiti Kid in the World Wrestling Federation.

Professional wrestling career
He started his career in the WWWF as a babyface in 1971, teaming up with Sonny Boy Hayes, Joey Russell, Little Beaver and Sky Low Low. Over the years, he fought in many promotions throughout North America. They included Stampede, AWA, NWA, Championship Wrestling from Florida, Portland Wrestling and MACW.

On February 25, 1984, Haiti Kid appeared on an episode of WWF All-Star Wrestling teaming with Tiger Jackson to defeat Dana Carpenter and Poncho Boy. He appeared in Mr. T's corner at WrestleMania 2 in his match against Rowdy Roddy Piper. He also competed at WrestleMania III in a mixed tag team match with Hillbilly Jim and Little Beaver against King Kong Bundy, Little Tokyo and Lord Littlebrook.
 	
In 1993, he feuded with Butch Cassidy in Puerto Rico's World Wrestling Council.

Other media
He appeared in the comedy film Penitentiary III.

References

External links

 
 

1954 births
American male professional wrestlers
American sportspeople of Haitian descent
Midget professional wrestlers
Living people
Professional wrestlers from New York (state)
Stampede Wrestling alumni
20th-century professional wrestlers
Professional wrestlers from New York City